Westhill High School may refer to:
 Westhill High School (Connecticut) in Stamford, Connecticut, US
 Westhill Senior High School in Syracuse, New York, US
 Westhill Institute in Mexico City
 Westhill Academy in Westhill, Scotland, UK
 West Hill School in Stalybridge, England, UK
 West Hill High School in Montreal, Quebec, Canada
 West Hill Secondary School in Owen Sound, Ontario, Canada
 West Hill Collegiate Institute in Toronto, Ontario, Canada